Surfaces is an American music group based in College Station, Texas. It currently consists of vocalists/guitarists Forrest Frank and Colin Padalecki. Their music is a blend of surf music, jazz, soul, pop rock, hip hop, reggae, and calypso. They have released four studio albums. Their first independent studio album, Surf, was released in 2017.

History
Surfaces was formed in 2017. Colin Padalecki began creating music in high school with his cousin and singer Alexa Padalecki. Colin began to upload his music online while attending Texas A&M University in College Station, Texas. Forrest Frank, a recent Baylor University graduate from Texas, reached out to Colin after hearing his music and invited him to record music at his houseboat. They released their first album together under the moniker Surfaces in December 2017, entitled Surf. The album's third track, 24 / 7 / 365, has over 70 million streams on Spotify. After the release of Surf, Forrest Frank released a project with producer Biskwiq under the alias Forrest in July 2018. Notable tracks from the project include "Your Soul" and "Why Not Me", which have each amassed over 20 million combined streams on Spotify.

In January 2019, the band released their second album, Where the Light Is, under the labels Caroline Records and TenThousand Projects. The seventh track from the album, "Sunday Best", became a top 40 hit in Canada, Ireland, New Zealand, Australia, Norway, the United Kingdom, and the United States, as well as the top 100 in Germany, Sweden, and Switzerland. The song has amassed over 730 million streams on Spotify as of December 2021 and is believed to have gained its popularity from video-sharing app TikTok. It was released to radio in March 2020. A music video for the track was released on YouTube on July 10, 2019.

Their third album, Horizons, was released on February 28, 2020. The music duo released numerous singles as well, which included "Keep It Gold", "Good Day", "Bloom", and "Lazy", all of which were included as tracks in Horizons. In 2019, they also released two independent singles: "Palm Trees", and "Take Some Time", which were not featured on any album. Other singles include "Be Alright" and "Falling", which were both released in 2017. The single "Low" was released in 2018. Surfaces made their debut on late-night television on March 2, 2020, performing "Sunday Best" on Late Night with Seth Meyers. In June 2020, the band released "Learn to Fly", a single in collaboration with singer Elton John, produced and recorded online, during the COVID-19 pandemic. By June 12, 2020, "Sunday Best" charted at No. 20 on the Billboard Hot 100; the single peaked at No. 19 a week later.

Their fourth album, Pacifico, was released on June 25, 2021. It features the single "Wave of You". The Deluxe version also includes the single "Sheesh!" with Tai Verdes. Their fifth album, Hidden Youth, was released on August 26, 2022.

Discography

Studio albums

Singles

Promotional singles

Notes

References

Musical groups established in 2017
Musicians from Houston
Caroline Records artists
2017 establishments in Texas